A crossmember is a structural section that is transverse to the main structure.  In the automotive industry, the term typically refers to a component, usually of steel, usually boxed, that is bolted across the underside of a monocoque / unibody motor vehicle, to support the internal combustion engine and / or transmission. For the suspension of any car to operate as it should, for proper handling, and to keep the body panels in alignment, the frame has to be strong enough to cope with the loads applied to it.  It must not deflect, and it has to have enough torsional strength to resist twisting.

A "K" member is a crossmember in a vehicle with a longitudinally-mounted engine, contains the engine mounts.cross member of frame is I section.

In early Ford vehicles
An "X" crossmember can usually be found on the frames of vintage.
Although it used more substantial rails than a Model T, the Model A frame was still just a simple "ladder" design.  Unlike the '32 frame, which had a K-member, and '33 to '48 frames, which were equipped with a substantial X-member, the A-frame was only fitted with front, center, and rear crossmembers.

Auto parts